Cordillera is a corregimiento, a subdivision of a district, in Boquerón District, Chiriquí Province, Panama. Its population as of 1990 was 361; its population as of 2000 was 471.

References

Corregimientos of Chiriquí Province